Johnson County is a county located in the U.S. state of Tennessee. As of the 2020 census, the population was 17,948. Its county seat is Mountain City. It is the state's northeasternmost county, sharing borders with Virginia and North Carolina.

History
Johnson County was created in 1836 from parts of Carter County.  This followed several years of bickering over the location of Carter County's seat, with residents of what is now Johnson County arguing that travel to Elizabethton was too lengthy and difficult.  When their petition to move the seat to a more central location was rejected, they petitioned the state legislature for the creation of a new county.  The new county was named after Thomas Johnson, an early settler.  The county seat was initially named "Taylorsville" in honor of Colonel James P. Taylor (it was changed to "Mountain City" in the 1880s).

Most Johnson Countians supported the Union during the Civil War.  The county's residents rejected secession by a margin of 788 to 111 in Tennessee's secession referendum on June 8, 1861.  The county sent a sizable delegation to the Greeneville session of the pro-Union East Tennessee Convention in June 1861.

Due in large part to the county's remoteness, the railroads did not reach Johnson until the early 20th century.  The arrival of the railroads during this period aided the development of the timber and manganese mining industries.

Geography

Situated entirely within the Blue Ridge Mountains, Johnson County is relatively rugged and hilly. The county's boundary with Sullivan County to the northwest is defined as the ridgeline of Holston Mountain, while the Iron Mountains provide the county's boundary with Carter County to the southwest.

High elevation
In terms of average elevation, Johnson County is one of the highest counties (if not the highest) in Tennessee. The highest place in Johnson County is Snake Mountain's lower peak, (near the North Carolina state line), at 5,518 feet (1,682 m).

Lakes
Watauga Lake

Adjacent counties
Washington County, Virginia (north)
Grayson County, Virginia (northeast)
Ashe County, North Carolina (east)
Watauga County, North Carolina (southeast)
Avery County, North Carolina (south)
Carter County (southwest)
Sullivan County (west)

National protected areas
Appalachian Trail (part)
Cherokee National Forest (part)

Demographics

2020 census

As of the 2020 United States census, there were 17,948 people, 6,794 households, and 4,635 families residing in the county.

2000 census
As of the census of 2000, there were 17,499 people, 6,827 households, and 4,751 families residing in the county.  The population density was 59 people per square mile (23/km2).  There were 7,879 housing units at an average density of 26 per square mile (10/km2).  The racial makeup of the county was 96.40% White, 2.42% Black or African American, 0.34% Native American, 0.12% Asian, 0.02% Pacific Islander, 0.23% from other races, and 0.46% from two or more races.  0.86% of the population were Hispanic or Latino of any race.

There were 6,827 households, out of which 26.40% had children under the age of 18 living with them, 55.40% were married couples living together, 10.00% had a female householder with no husband present, and 30.40% were non-families. 26.40% of all households were made up of individuals, and 11.50% had someone living alone who was 65 years of age or older.  The average household size was 2.35 and the average family size was 2.81.

In the county, the population was spread out, with 19.70% under the age of 18, 7.40% from 18 to 24, 30.80% from 25 to 44, 27.10% from 45 to 64, and 15.00% who were 65 years of age or older.  The median age was 40 years. For every 100 females there were 114.60 males.  For every 100 females age 18 and over, there were 114.40 males.

The median income for a household in the county was $23,067, and the median income for a family was $28,400. Males had a median income of $24,018 versus $18,817 for females. The per capita income for the county was $13,388.  About 18.70% of families and 22.60% of the population were below the poverty line, including 26.80% of those under age 18 and 21.50% of those age 65 or over.

Male inmates in the Northeast Correctional Complex, southwest of Mountain City, account for 1,299 (7.4%) of the county's population.

Communities

Town
Mountain City (county seat)

Unincorporated communities
Butler
 Crandull
Doe Valley
Doeville
Laurel Bloomery
Midway
Shady Valley
Sutherland
Trade

Politics

Johnson County is a long-term Republican stronghold and is located within Tennessee's 1st congressional district, which has not been represented by a Democrat since 1881. Johnson County has never been carried by a Democratic presidential nominee. Since a Republican Party presidential nominee first appeared on the ballot in Tennessee in 1868, there has only been one occasion when Johnson County's voters didn't vote for the official Republican Party candidate, and that was in 1912, when voters voted for the official Bull Moose Progressive Party candidate, Theodore Roosevelt, the former Republican president of the United States from 1901 to 1909. Johnson County's voters chose Roosevelt in 1912 rather than the man who was then the incumbent Republican president of the United States, William Howard Taft (president of the United States from 1909 to 1913).

Johnson County was reportedly the strongest county in the US for Republican candidates Calvin Coolidge in 1924, Herbert Hoover in 1932 and the second strongest behind Jackson County, Kentucky for Alf Landon in 1936. The Republican candidate has consistently won since 1916, during which period no Republican candidate has received less than 57 percent of the county's vote. In 2012, Mitt Romney received 74.4 percent, while Donald Trump received 82.2 percent in 2016, and then 82.9 percent in 2020.

In popular culture
Steve Earle's song "Copperhead Road" is about a family of moonshiners from Johnson County – where, until 2018, alcohol was prohibited ever since the Twenty-First Amendment. The second verse contains the line "Johnson County Sheriff painted on the side".

The childhood home of Valene Ewing, a character in the TV series Dallas and Knots Landing, is in Johnson County, in the fictional community of Shula.

See also
National Register of Historic Places listings in Johnson County, Tennessee
RedTail Mountain Resort, a luxury inn and country club in Mountain City
North Carolina–Tennessee–Virginia Corners

References

External links

 Johnson County Government Official Website
 Johnson County Chamber of Commerce
 Johnson County Schools

 
1836 establishments in Tennessee
Populated places established in 1836
Counties of Appalachia
Second Amendment sanctuaries in Tennessee
East Tennessee